Mossfield Organic Farm is a 300-acre dairy farm in Birr, County Offaly, in Ireland. Owned by Ralph Haslam, it was converted to organic farming in 1999 and since 2005 has produced a number of products using milk from his Friesian cows.

Products

Mossfield Mature is an organically certified Gouda-style cheese. The cheese is aged for over eight months.

There is also a range of Mossfield Flavoured cheeses:
Garlic & Basil
Tomato & Herb
Mature
Young Plain
Cumin Seed

In addition to cheese the farm produces milk, buttermilk and yogurt.

Awards
The cheese has won many awards including the Gold Medal at the World Cheese Awards in 2006, and was the overall winner at the 2010 National Organic Awards.

References

External links
 Website of Mossfield Organic Farm

Irish cheeses
Cow's-milk cheeses